The 2nd Legislative Assembly of British Columbia sat from 1875 to 1878. The members were elected in the British Columbia general election held in September and October 1875. The government of George Anthony Walkem was defeated on a confidence motion on January 25, 1876, and Andrew Charles Elliott was asked to form a new government. On March 29, 1878, a government bill to redistribute the seats in the legislature was defeated and the assembly was dissolved on April 12, 1878.

There were three sessions of the 2nd Legislature:

James Trimble served as speaker.

Members of the 2nd General Assembly 
The following members were elected to the assembly in 1875

Notes:

By-elections 
By-elections were held for the following members appointed to the provincial cabinet, as was required at the time:
Thomas Basil Humphreys, Minister of Finance and Agriculture, acclaimed February 15, 1876
Andrew Charles Elliott, Premier, elected February 22, 1876
Forbes George Vernon, Commissioner of Lands and Works, elected March 11, 1876
William Smithe, Minister of Finance and Agriculture, acclaimed August 14, 1876
Alexander Edmund Batson Davie, Provincial Secretary, defeated by George Cowan on June 20, 1877

By-elections were held to replace members for various other reasons:

References 

Political history of British Columbia
Terms of British Columbia Parliaments
1875 establishments in British Columbia
1878 disestablishments in British Columbia